DePatie is a surname. Notable people with the surname include:

David H. DePatie (1929–2021), American film and television producer, son of Edmond
DePatie–Freleng Enterprises, an American animation production company
Edmond L. DePatie (1900–1966), American film industry executive